The 2009–10 season of the Norwegian Premier League, the highest volleyball league for men in Norway.

League table

References
Table

Volleyball competitions in Norway
Volley
Volley
2009 in volleyball
2010 in volleyball